The generic top-level domain (gTLD) .pharmacy was launched by the National Association of Boards of Pharmacy (NABP) in 2014. The goal was to "provide consumers around the world a means for identifying safe, legal, and ethical online pharmacies and related resources".  A review by the NABP of more than 10,800 websites selling prescription drugs "found that nearly 97% do not follow pharmacy laws and standards established to protect the public health".

Criticism 
The impartiality of the domain was questioned, because Eli Lilly and Company, Merck & Co., and Pfizer are the main contributors to the NABP application. Previously, the application was challenged by Public Citizen, Knowledge Ecology International, and the Canadian International Pharmacy Association.

References

Computer-related introductions in 2014
Generic top-level domains
Online retailers
Pharmacies